is a former Japanese football player.

Playing career
Yaso was born in Takatsuki on October 31, 1969. After graduating from Kobe University, he joined his local club Gamba Osaka in 1993. Although he played 3 matches in 1993, he could not play at all in the match in 1994. In 1995, he moved to Japan Football League club Vissel Kobe. However he could hardly play in the match. In 1996, he moved to Regional Leagues club Albireo Niigata (later Albirex Niigata). In 1998, he moved to Regional Leagues club Yokogawa Electric. The club was promoted to Japan Football League from 1999. He played many matches as midfielder for the club and retired end of 2000 season.

Club statistics

References

External links

1969 births
Living people
Kobe University alumni
Association football people from Osaka Prefecture
People from Takatsuki, Osaka
Japanese footballers
J1 League players
Japan Football League (1992–1998) players
Japan Football League players
Gamba Osaka players
Vissel Kobe players
Albirex Niigata players
Tokyo Musashino United FC players
Association football midfielders